D3 is a state road in western parts of Croatia connecting Rijeka on the Adriatic coast to Zagreb, Karlovac and Varaždin, as well as to Goričan border crossing to Hungary. Furthermore, the D3 road is used as a parallel road to a number of motorways in Croatia, namely the A4 motorway north of Zagreb, the A1 motorway between Zagreb and Bosiljevo 2 interchange south of Karlovac and finally the A6 motorway between Bosiljevo 2 interchange and Rijeka and it connects to nearly all motorway interchanges on that route either directly or via connecting roads.

The D3 state road is concurrent in parts of its route with other state roads, most notably the D1 between Zagreb and Karlovac, as well as some sections of the A4 (south of Popovec interchange) and the A3 (between Ivanja Reka and Lučko interchanges) motorways. The A3 and A4 motorway sections that are concurrent with the D3 state road are also a part of Zagreb bypass and are not tolled.

The road, as well as all other state roads in Croatia, is managed and maintained by Hrvatske ceste, a state-owned company.

Traffic volume 
Traffic is regularly counted and reported by Hrvatske ceste, operator of the road.

Road junctions and populated areas

Maps

Sources

D003
D003
D003
D003
D003
D003
D003